Frank Stephenson (born 19 April 1934) is a former  Australian rules footballer who played with North Melbourne in the Victorian Football League (VFL).

Notes

External links 

Living people
1934 births
Australian rules footballers from Victoria (Australia)
North Melbourne Football Club players
East Ballarat Football Club players
Perth Football Club players